The Town of Grand Lake is a statutory town located in Grand County, Colorado, United States. The town population was 410 at the 2020 United States Census.

History
The town of Grand Lake was originally an outfitting and supply point for the mining settlements of Lulu City, Teller City, and Gaskill, but today is a tourist destination adjacent to the western entrance to Rocky Mountain National Park, which surrounds the lake and the town on three sides. Grand Lake was the Grand County seat of government from 1882 to 1888. It was incorporated on June 23, 1944.

The Kauffman House is an NRHP-listed rustic log house that functioned as a hotel from its construction in 1892 until 1946. The Grand Lake Area Historical Society purchased the house in 1973 and converted it into a museum as the only pre-20th century log hotel remaining in Grand Lake.

Fred N. Selak, ″The Hermit of Grand Lake″
Frederick Nicholas Selak (1865–1926) was an early pioneer of the Grand Lake area. He operated a stage line with his brother as well as saloons and other businesses in the early days of Grand Lake. When he died he owned 300 acres of land in and around Grand Lake as well as interest in two mining operations.

In 1926 Selak lived alone in a small log cabin about 3 miles outside of Grand Lake. He was referred to as "The Hermit of Grand Lake", but  was known to have loaned money to locals, and rumored to have stashed up to $500,000 on his property. After friends became concerned they had not seen Selak for over a week, they checked on him, found his house had been ransacked, floorboards torn up, and Selak nowhere to be found. An investigation by the local Sheriff was unable to identify any leads. The intrigue surrounding the hermit and his wealth made the crime mystery a national story. An article in True Detective Mysteries magazine described the crime in the June, 1930 issue. The article had the title Echo Mountain′s Hanging Spectre and was written by A. G. Gertz of The Denver Post.

Selak's sister in California, Lillian Coffee, and her husband, Lawrence W. Coffee, were notified when Selak went missing. The two traveled to Colorado to assist in locating her brother. Lawrence Coffee was credited for helping identify the two suspects that would later confess to Selak's murder.

The two men had hanged Selak July 21 as retaliation related to a fencing dispute. When found on August 17, Selak's remains were still hanging from the pine tree where he was killed almost a month earlier. Selak's murderers said they only found $75 and some old coins when they searched Selak's property. It was the coins that alerted Coffee as to who the perpetrators might be. Rumors of the hidden cash persisted. In March, 1927, convinced there must be more valuables or cash stashed somewhere on the property, the townspeople planned a search of his property as soon as the snow cleared.

The two perpetrators, Arthur Osborn, 22 at the time of the murder, and his cousin, Ray Noakes, 21, were found guilty and given the death penalty. Like the man they killed, they themselves were hanged. They were executed in Cañon City, Colorado on March 30, 1928.

East Troublesome Fire
On October 14, 2020, the East Troublesome Fire ignited north of Parshall. The wildfire rapidly spread eastward toward Grand Lake and into Rocky Mountain National Park. As many as 794 firefighters fought the wildfire as it consumed  of forest and rangeland to become the second most extensive Colorado wildfire in recorded history. Thousands were evacuated, more than 300 homes were destroyed, and two residents were killed. The wildfire became the most expensive in Colorado history with insured losses alone of $543 million.

Geography
Grand Lake is located in northeastern Grand County at  (40.250493, -105.824323). To the southwest, US 34 leads  to Granby.

At the 2020 United States Census, the town had a total area of  including  of water.

Climate
Due to its elevation, Grand Lake has a subalpine climate (Köppen climate classification Dfc) with a short growing season, averaging just 49 days per year. Temperatures are chilly at night even through the summer months, and only three months have an average temperature of above .

Grand Lake

Grand Lake is Colorado's largest and deepest natural lake, and is part of the headwaters of the Colorado River. The lake became a component in the Colorado-Big Thompson Project (C-BT) in 1937, when it was recruited as a conduit for C-BT project water. The C-BT project diverts water from the Colorado River Basin east via the Alva B. Adams Tunnel under the Continental Divide and Rocky Mountain National Park to the Big Thompson River watershed, thence the South Platte River and ultimately the Mississippi River basin.

Grand Lake Yacht Club is a private club that hosts sailing races on the lake, and there are also publicly and privately operated marinas, a public boat ramp, and public boat docks on the lake.

Demographics

As of the census of 2000, there were 447 people, 219 households, and 121 families residing in the town. The racial makeup of the town was 96.20% White, 0.67% African American, 0.89% Native American, 0.67% Asian, 0.22% from other races, and 1.34% from two or more races. Hispanic or Latino of any race were 2.68% of the population.

There were 219 households, out of which 21.0% had children under the age of 18 living with them, 46.6% were married couples living together, 3.2% had a female householder with no husband present, and 44.7% were non-families. 35.2% of all households were made up of individuals, and 5.5% had someone living alone who was 65 years of age or older. The average household size was 2.02 and the average family size was 2.60.

In the town, the population was spread out, with 16.8% under the age of 18, 6.3% from 18 to 24, 29.3% from 25 to 44, 35.6% from 45 to 64, and 12.1% who were 65 years of age or older. The median age was 44 years. For every 100 females, there were 124.6 males. For every 100 females age 18 and over, there were 122.8 males.

The median income for a household in the town was $45,096, and the median income for a family was $55,750. Males had a median income of $30,833 versus $26,250 for females. The per capita income for the town was $34,676.  About 3.0% of families and 7.0% of the population were below the poverty line, including 7.4% of those under age 18 and none of those age 65 or over.

Culture
Grand Lake is home to the Rocky Mountain Repertory Theatre. This summer stock theatre company produces various theatrical productions throughout the year, usually three Broadway musicals from June through August and one musical in September. In the spring of 2010, a new  theatre complex was built for the Rocky Mountain Repertory Theatre in Grand Lake.

Notable residents
Tim Allen
Marv Heemeyer
Fred Selak

See also

Colorado
Bibliography of Colorado
Index of Colorado-related articles
Outline of Colorado
List of counties in Colorado
List of municipalities in Colorado
List of places in Colorado
Arapaho National Forest
Arapaho National Recreation Area
Grand River
History of Rocky Mountain National Park

References

External links

Town of Grand Lake website
CDOT map of the Town of Grand Lake
Grand Lake Chamber of Commerce

 
Towns in Colorado
1879 establishments in Colorado
Populated places established in 1879